Kansas City Railway may refer to:
 Kansas City Southern Railway, a Class I railroad in ten U.S. states
 Kansas City Terminal Railway, a Class III terminal railroad in Kansas 
 Kansas City, Clinton and Springfield Railway, an abandoned railway in Kansas